Elko/Lionel P. Demers Memorial Airpark  is located  west southwest of Elko, British Columbia, Canada.

References

External links
Page about this airport on COPA's Places to fly airport directory.

Registered aerodromes in British Columbia
Regional District of East Kootenay